Upper Haughton is a locality in the Shire of Burdekin, Queensland, Australia.

History 
The locality was named and bounded on 23 February 2001. It presumably takes its name from the Haughton River which forms its western boundary. The river in turn was originally named after stockman Richard Houghton by pastoralist and explorer James Cassidy. However, it was renamed on 28 April 1950 to Haughton River at the request of the local residents and the Queensland Electoral Office.

References 

Shire of Burdekin
Localities in Queensland